Warriors of the Yang Clan is a 2004 Chinese costume drama, based on the Generals of the Yang Family legends.

Plot
Though full of ideas and passion, the 4th son of the Song Dynasty general Yang Ye never seemed capable to satisfy his father. After a chance encounter, he fell deeply in love with Pan Yuyan, the daughter of the chancellor Pan Renmei. At the border with the Liao Dynasty, he saved the Liao Princess Mingji twice, which initiated her obsession with him. Meanwhile, Yang Ye's 7th son helped his 3rd brother propose to the housemaid and their best friend Yang Chuchu, until finally realizing that her love was himself. Right before her wedding, Yang Chuchu was raped by Pan Yuyan's brother Pan Bao and committed suicide, and Pan Bao died in the ensuring brawl with the Yang brothers. The 3rd and 4th sons were attacked by Pan Renmei's assassins in jail and had to flee. The 3rd son finally found love with pure-hearted bandit Mao Xiaoying, while back home the 6th son's romance with childhood friend Princess Chai blossomed. Yiyun, a Liao spy, succeeded in putting the Yangs in great danger, but eventually sacrificed her own life to save the family and the 5th son whom she developed feelings for. To be with the 4th son, Pan Yuyan parted ways with her vengeful father, who had plotted with the Liao army to lure Yang Ye and the emperor to a trap. While the emperor escaped from the ambush at Golden Beach, Yang Ye and many sons died tragically one after another. Captured alive, the 4th son was presented with a choice: die a hero like his father and brothers, or become a despicable traitor and marry Princess Mingji whom he did not love - the only option if he wanted to return home and unite with family again.

Cast

Soundtrack

Track list
 Intro (引子) [1:14]
 "Rì Luò Jīn Shā Tān" (日落金沙滩; "Sunset at Golden Beach") performed by Zhou Xiao'ou [4:21]
 Dawn (清晨) [0:44]
 Encounter (遇见) [2:08]
 Competition (比武) [1:07]
 Love Already (爱了) [4:26]
 Chase at the Market (集市中的追逐) [1:06]
 Letter from Him (他的来信) [1:22]
 Paradise (天伦之乐) [2:55]
 Return My Jade Pendant (还我玉佩) [1:34]
 Anticipation under the Afterglow (夕阳中的期盼) [1:11]
 Darkness is Coming (黑暗即将来临) [2:21]
 Farewell, My Love (再见,我的爱人) [3:24]
 Foreigner's Blade (异族的尖刀) [1:41]
 Set Off (出征) [3:25]
 Black Horse (黑色戏马) [1:42]
 Futile Love (没有结果的爱情) [5:14]
 Bone Fighting (骨战) [1:15]
 Wasteland (荒原) [1:45]
 "Nǐ Kě Yǐ Bù Dǒng" (你可以不懂; "You Can Misunderstand") performed by Alec Su [3:57]
 My Blood (我的血液) [4:32]
 "Yǐn Yǐn Zuò Tòng" (隐隐作痛; "Obtuse Pain") performed by Sun Yue [3:53]

References
 

2004 Chinese television series debuts
Works based on The Generals of the Yang Family
Television series set in the Northern Song
Chinese wuxia television series
Television series set in the Liao dynasty
Television shows set in Kaifeng
Mandarin-language television shows
Television series by Huace Media